Prolagus oeningensis is an extinct lagomorph and the type species of its genus, Prolagus. It lived from 15.97 to 7.75 Ma, existing for about 8 million years.

Range
The species has been found in various locations in Europe and Asia. It was named after the town of Öhningen in Germany, its type locality in the Upper Freshwater Molasse.

Diet
This species was possibly a herbivore like other living lagomorphs.

Notes

References

Additional references of the Paleobiology Database

Pikas
Miocene mammals of Europe
Langhian first appearances
Tortonian extinctions